Girls' Night Out is the fourth studio album by Canadian rock band Toronto, released in 1983. The first U.S. release featured 3-D cover artwork and included red/blue 3-D glasses. More personnel changes on this album, with bassist Gary LaLonde passing the torch to Mike Gingrich. The CD release features one bonus track, "What About Love".

The album is dedicated to audio engineer Robbie Whelan, who died in a car accident earlier in the year.

Track listing

Side 1
"Girls' Night Out" (Brian Allen) - 2:46
"All I Need" (Doug May, Stuart Peterson) - 3:41
"Ready to Make Up" (Allen) - 3:59
"Standing In" (Allen, Jim Vallance) - 4:21
"Talk to Me" (Allen, Sheron Alton) - 3:54

Side 2
"All Night Love Affair" (Allen, Alton, Scott Kreyer, Holly Woods) - 3:29
"When Can I See You Again (Toronto)" (Kreyer, Vallance, Woods) - 3:42
"Don't Give Me the Once Over" (Stan Meissner, Fred Mollin) - 3:53
"Those Eyes" (Allen) - 3:09
"Who's Your Lover" (Allen) - 3:18

Musicians 
Holly Woods - lead vocals
Sheron Alton - guitar, backing vocals
Brian Allen - guitar, backing vocals
Scott Kreyer - keyboards
Mike Gingrich - bass guitar
Barry Connors - drums

Charts

Certifications

References

1983 albums
Toronto (band) albums